Juan Zelada (born 26 April 1981) is a Spanish singer, songwriter and musician.

Zelada was raised in a musical family environment, consisting of jam sessions throughout the different generations. In 2006 he completed his studies at the Liverpool Institute for Performing Arts, where he received an award for composition from Paul McCartney, calling his recording a “smashing CD”.

Having moved to London, he set up a band, whilst still playing in restaurants, pubs, hotels and cruise ships. He began to gig around the London scene to great acclaim including supporting Amy Winehouse on her Back to Black tour.

In 2012, he released the single “Breakfast in Spitalfields” which became a national success, being the most aired single on BBC Radio 2 only second to Adele.

He continues to tour with his band, supporting artists such as Ben Howard, The Noisettes, Gavin Degraw or Michael Kiwanuka, as well as his own headline tours, including a festival tour with over 30 festivals in the summer of 2012.

His album High Ceilings and Collar Bones was released in 2012 by Decca Records, receiving compliments from BBC London News as “one to watch”. The second single "The Blues Remain" became single of the week for iTunes, and was also included in the BBC “A Playlist”.

In 2013, he released the EP “Follow the River” after a successful crowdfunding campaign with Pledge Music also receiving a European Border Breakers Award at the Eurosonic Festival in Groningen, and an invitation from Jools Holland to attend his BBC show.

He returned to Spain, after an inspirational trip backpacking around South America in 2014 writing a lot of the material which would be included in his new album, as well as a blog called “Away with music”, interacting with other local musicians.

On his return he worked alongside producer Carlos Jean in Spain to release Back on Track in early 2015 under Spanish label MUWOM. Without retaining his soul style, the album incorporated other musical styles such as electronica.

The first single “Dreaming Away” was aired on major national stations, and was included in a national TV advertising campaign with Nationale Nederlanden.

With “Back on Track” he has been touring extensively with his new band around Spain, also sharing the stage with artists such as Eli Paperboy Reed and Delorentos.

Discography

Albums

EPs
 The Story of Stuff - 2010
 Follow the River - 2013

Singles

References

External links
 Official Juan Zelada Website
 Juan Zelada blog
 Juan Zelada on Youtube
 Juan Zelada in "The Sound of Emotions" by Audi
 Juan Zelada in "Tu Historia, Tu Canción" by Renfe
 BBC Radio 2 in Concert Juan Zelada - Interview with Johnnie Walker
 Juan Zelada article in Stereoboard.com

Spanish songwriters
Living people
Alumni of the Liverpool Institute for Performing Arts
English-language singers from Spain
Musicians from Madrid
1981 births
21st-century Spanish singers
21st-century Spanish male singers